Ozieri  is a town and comune of approximatively 11,000 inhabitants in the province of Sassari, northern Sardinia (Italy), in the Logudoro historical region.
 
Its cathedral of the Immacolata is the episcopal see of the Roman Catholic Diocese of Ozieri. 
Ozieri is the centre of the earliest known archaeological culture on Sardinia (known as Ozieri culture).

Main sights 
 Cathedral of the Immacolata, known from the 15th century. It was restored from 1550 to 1571. It has a nave and two aisles. It houses a poloptych of the Madonna di Loreto (16th century), work of a local master.
 Basilica of Sant'Antioco di Bisarcio, one of the largest Romanesque churches in Sardinia.
 Grotte di San Michele (3500–2700 BC) - Ozieri gives its name to the Ozieri culture, a prehistoric civilization whose first findings were excavated in the local caves of San Michele starting from 1914.
 Pont'ezzu, a Roman bridge, dating to the 2nd century AD and restored in the 3rd–4th century AD. It has six arcades for a total length of 
Civic Archaeological Museum "Alle Clarisse", one of the most important museums in Northern Sardinia, with an archaeological, numismatic and ethnographic collection that date from prehistoric times to the modern age.

Transportation 
Ozieri can be reached from Sassari through the SS.597 National road, and by Olbia (SS.199).

The city has a railways station located in the frazione of Chilivani (lines to Olbia, Porto Torres and Cagliari).

People 
 Luca Sbisa, professional ice hockey player
 Mariangela Demurtas, musician, Tristania

Twin towns
 Fiorano Modenese, Italy
 Maranello, Italy

References

External links

 Official website
  

Cities and towns in Sardinia